Zildyarovo (Yeldär) is a rural locality (a selo) and the administrative centre of Zildyarovsky Selsoviet, Miyakinsky District, Bashkortostan, Russia. The population was 890 as of 2010. There are 11 streets.

Geography 
Zildyarovo is located 34 km southwest of Kirgiz-Miyaki (the district's administrative centre) by road. Shatmantamak is the nearest rural locality.

References 

Rural localities in Miyakinsky District